Mambas Noirs  FC are a Beninese football club based in Cotonou. They currently play in the Benin Premier League for season 2010.

Football clubs in Benin